Madeline's Christmas is an illustrated children's picture book by Ludwig Bemelmans. It features Bemelman's popular children's character Madeline. It was first published in 1956 as a special book insert to McCalls Magazine, but it wasn't issued independently until 1985.

Plot
Madeline finds herself having to manage the needs of the school when everyone else falls ill.

In the 1990 television version of this story, an old lady named Madame Marie replaces the magician.

Details
 Madeline's Christmas by Ludwig Bemelmans. Publisher: New York, N.Y., U.S.A.: Viking Kestrel, 1985.

References

 https://web.archive.org/web/20140421082335/http://isbndb.com/d/book/madelines_christmas.html

1956 children's books
1985 children's books
American picture books
Children's fiction books
Christmas children's books
Paris in fiction
Works originally published in McCall's